An Vannieuwenhuyse (born 3 March 1991) is a retired Belgian bobsledder. She competed in the two-woman event at the 2018 Winter Olympics. She announced her retirement from the sport in April 2021.

References

External links
 

1991 births
Living people
Belgian female bobsledders
Olympic bobsledders of Belgium
Bobsledders at the 2018 Winter Olympics
Bobsledders at the 2022 Winter Olympics
Place of birth missing (living people)